Den svenska björnstammen (Swedish for "The Swedish Bear Population") is a Swedish musical pop band from Norrköping, formed in 2010 and consisting of Dan Brännvall, Kim Dahlberg, Petter Frisendahl, Ambjörn Göransson, Mattias Göransson, Klas Isaksson and Åke Olofsson. The band was originally signed to Pope Records who has a special distribution agreement with Universal Music Sweden since 2009.

History
The band was one of three finalists for the Metro on Stage music competition. In 2011, it had a breakthrough with the song "Vart jag mig i världen vänder" ("Wherever I Turn in the World"), topping the Swedish national record chart Sverigetopplistan for six weeks. The band's follow-up song, "Svalkar vinden" ("Does The Wind Cool") and "Trumma Trumma" ("Drum Drum") also charted.

Discography

Studio albums

Extended plays
2008: Classics
2010: Dansmusik EP (Dance Music EP)

Singles

See also 

 List of dance-pop artists
 List of Swedes in music
 List of Universal Music Group artists
 Music of Sweden

Notes

References

External links
, the band's official website

2010 establishments in Sweden
Musical groups established in 2010
Norrköping
Swedish dance music groups
Swedish pop music groups
Swedish-language singers
Electronic dance music groups
Universal Music Group artists